Tabory is a rural locality (a selo) and the administrative center of Taborinsky District, Sverdlovsk Oblast, Russia. Population:

References

Notes

Sources

Rural localities in Sverdlovsk Oblast